Rainer Groß (born 18 June 1947) is a German cross-country skier. He competed in the men's 15 kilometre event at the 1972 Winter Olympics.

References

External links
 

1947 births
Living people
German male cross-country skiers
Olympic cross-country skiers of East Germany
Cross-country skiers at the 1972 Winter Olympics
People from Greiz (district)
Sportspeople from Thuringia